The Rimkai is a lake in Krakės Eldership, Kėdainiai District Municipality, central Lithuania. It belongs to the Smilga basin (part of the Nevėžis basin).

Coasts of the lake are flat, covered by reed beds.

The name Rimkai comes from the village name Rimkai.

References

Lakes of Kėdainiai District Municipality